Concord is a home rule-class city in Lewis County, Kentucky, in the United States. The population was 35 at the 2010 census. It is part of the Maysville Micropolitan Statistical Area.

Geography
Concord is located in northwestern Lewis County at  (38.687320, -83.490696), on the south bank of the Ohio River. Kentucky Route 8 has its western terminus in the city and leads southeast  to Vanceburg, the Lewis county seat. Kentucky Route 57 has its eastern terminus in Concord and leads southwest  to Tollesboro.

Demographics

As of the census of 2000, there were 28 people, 13 households, and 9 families residing in the city. The racial makeup of the city was 96.43% White, and 3.57% from two or more races.

There were 13 households, out of which 23.1% had children under the age of 18 living with them, 53.8% were married couples living together, 7.7% had a female householder with no husband present, and 23.1% were non-families. 15.4% of all households were made up of individuals, and 7.7% had someone living alone who was 65 years of age or older. The average household size was 2.15 and the average family size was 2.30.

In the city, the population was spread out, with 14.3% under the age of 18, 7.1% from 18 to 24, 17.9% from 25 to 44, 50.0% from 45 to 64, and 10.7% who were 65 years of age or older. The median age was 50 years. For every 100 females, there were 115.4 males. For every 100 females age 18 and over, there were 118.2 males.

The median income for a household in the city was $18,125, and the median income for a family was $20,625. Males had a median income of $11,250 versus $0 for females. The per capita income for the city was $7,897. There were no families and 23.3% of the population living below the poverty line, including no under eighteens and none of those over 64.

See also
 List of cities and towns along the Ohio River

References

External links
 

Cities in Kentucky
Cities in Lewis County, Kentucky
Maysville, Kentucky micropolitan area
Kentucky populated places on the Ohio River